Bolaji Olufunmileyi Owasanoye is a Nigerian lawyer and human rights activist. He currently serves as the Chairman of the Independent Corrupt Practices and other Related Offences Commission, ICPC, an anticorruption agency in Nigeria.

Early life and education 
Owasanoye was born in 1963. He graduated from University of Ife in 1984 with a degree in law and was called to the Nigerian Bar in 1985. He also obtained a master's degree in Law in 1987 from the University of Lagos.

Career 
Owasanoye started his career as an assistant lecturer at the University of Lagos. He moved to the National Institute of Advanced Legal Studies (NIALS) in 1991 and became a Professor of law 10 years later.

In August 2015, he was appointed as the Executive Secretary of the Presidential Advisory Committee Against Corruption (PACAC) before being appointed to the ICPC. He was a proponent of the Proceeds of Crime bill, Whistle-blower and Witness Protection Bill passed by the Nigerian National Assembly.

He has also worked as a consultant for Nigerian federal and state agencies as well as international agencies such as the World Bank and USAID.

In 1997, he co-founded the Human Development Initiative (HDI), a non-profit organisation. In 2020, he was awarded the rank of Senior Advocate of Nigeria (SAN).

Publications 

 The regulation of child custody and access in Nigeria
 Fearing the dark: The use of witchcraft to control human trafficking victims and sustain vulnerability
 Improving Case Management Coordination Amongst the Police, Prosecution and Court
 NIALS Laws of Nigeria: Evidence Act 2011
 NIALS Laws of Nigeria: Electoral Act
 Information and communication technologies (ICT), freedom of information and privacy rights in Nigeria: an assessment

Awards and recognition 

 University of Lagos Scholarship Award (1986/1987)
 UN Institute for Training and Research Fellowship Award (1991, 1994)
 US Information Service International Visitors Award (1991)
 British Council Fellowship Award (1992)
 Senior Special Fellowship, United Nations Institute for Training and Research (2001)
 Officer of the Federal Republic OFR (2002)

References 

21st-century Nigerian lawyers
Nigerian human rights activists

Year of birth missing (living people)
Living people
University of Lagos alumni
Obafemi Awolowo University alumni
Senior Advocates of Nigeria
Academic staff of the University of Lagos